Princess Leopoldine of Baden (Leopoldine Wilhelmine Amalie Pauline Maximiliane; 22 February 1837, Karlsruhe - 23 December 1903, Strasbourg) was a Princess of Baden by birth and Princess of Hohenlohe-Langenburg by marriage.

Life 
Leopoldine was the fourth and youngest daughter of Prince William of Baden (1792-1859) and Duchess Elisabeth Alexandrine of Württemberg (1802-1864), daughter of Duke Louis of Württemberg. Her paternal grandparents were Charles Frederick of Baden, the first Grand Duke of Baden, and his second wife, Baroness Louise Caroline Geyer of Geyersberg, Countess of Hochberg.  She grew up in Karlsruhe, together with her two older sisters, Sophie (1834-1904) and Elizabeth (1835-1891).

Princess Leopoldine married on 24 September 1862 in Karlsruhe, Prince Hermann of Hohenlohe-Langenburg (1832-1913), second son of Prince Ernst I, Prince of Hohenlohe-Langenburg, and Princess Feodora of Leiningen. They had three children:
 Prince Ernest William Frederick Maximilian Charles of Hohenlohe-Langenburg (1863-1950); succeeded his father as Ernst II, married in 1896 Princess Alexandra of Saxe-Coburg and Gotha (1878-1942), had issue.
 Princess Elise Victoria Feodora Sophie Adelheid of Hohenlohe-Langenburg (1864-1929); married in 1884 Heinrich XXVII, Prince Reuss Younger Line (1858-1928), had issue.
 Princess Feodora of Hohenlohe-Langenburg (1866-1932); married in 1894 Emich, 5th Prince of Leiningen (1866-1939), had issue.

Princess Leopoldine founded the Leopoldine Association. In Strasbourg, where her husband was appointed as the Governor of Alsace-Lorraine, she took mainly ceremonial duties. She died the day before Christmas Eve 1903, after a long illness. She was buried in the family cemetery in Langenburg.

Ancestry

References 
 Annette Borchardt-Wenzel: Die Frauen am badischen Hof. Gefährtinnen der Großherzöge zwischen Liebe, Pflicht und Intrigen, Piper Verlag GmbH München, 2003, 
 Paul Zinsmaier: Leopoldine Fürstin zu Hohenlohe-Langenburg, in: Badische Biographien, vol. 6, edited by A. Krieger and R. Obser, Heidelberg, 1935, p. 785 ff

Princesses of Baden
Princesses of Hohenlohe-Langenburg
1837 births
1903 deaths
19th-century German people